Sangoné Sarr (born 7 July 1992) is a Senegalese professional footballer who plays as a midfielder for Schaffhausen in Switzerland.

Career
Sarr played for Jeanne d'Arc, Renaissance de Dakar and AS Pikine before joining FC Zürich players in 2015.

On 18 January 2019, Sarr was loaned out to FC Rapperswil-Jona from FC Zürich for the rest of the season.

References

1992 births
Footballers from Dakar
Living people
Association football midfielders
Senegalese footballers
Swiss Super League players
Swiss Challenge League players
Swiss Promotion League players
AS Pikine players
FC Zürich players
FC Rapperswil-Jona players
FC Schaffhausen players